Salvatore Nocita (born  30 July 1934) is an Italian television and film director, editor and screenwriter.

Born in Arcisate, Varese, in 1958 Nocita  became an employee of RAI as an editor, and in 1968 he debuted as director of the journalistic program Faccia a faccia. Shorty later he started directing critical acclaimed television films and TV-series, such as I Nicotera, Gamma, Storia di Anna and The Betrothed. His 1976 television miniseries Ligabue was later released in cinemas in a reduced version and got him a Nastro d'Argento for best new director.

References

External links 
 

1934 births 
20th-century Italian people
Italian film directors
Italian television directors
Italian screenwriters
Italian male screenwriters
People from the Province of Varese
Living people
Nastro d'Argento winners